St Catherine  is a small, but very spread out, rural village within the civil parish of Batheaston in Bath and North East Somerset and Marshfield Parish, South Gloucestershire, England, United Kingdom.

Location

About  up the valley are two Sites of Special Scientific Interest, St. Catherine's Valley and Monkswood Valley.

History

St Catherine was part of the hundred of Bath Forum.

Governance

The parish council has responsibility for local issues, including setting an annual precept (local rate) to cover the council's operating costs and producing annual accounts for public scrutiny. The parish council evaluates local planning applications and works with the local police, district council officers, and neighbourhood watch groups on matters of crime, security, and traffic. The parish council's role also includes initiating projects for the maintenance and repair of parish facilities, such as the village hall or community centre, playing fields and playgrounds, as well as consulting with the district council on the maintenance, repair, and improvement of highways, drainage, footpaths, public transport, and street cleaning. Conservation matters (including trees and listed buildings) and environmental issues are also of interest to the council. St Catherine's Parish Meeting is too small to be a traditional Parish Council.  Often the Chair lives outside the parish. 

The parish falls within the unitary authority of Bath and North East Somerset, created in 1996; South Gloucestershire when north of St Catherine's Brook. Before 1974 the parish was part of the Bathavon Rural District.

The parish is part of the North East Somerset Parliamentary constituency. It was also part of the South West England constituency of the European Parliament prior to Britain leaving the European Union in January 2020.

Religious sites

St Catherine's church was built in the 12th century as a chapel-of-ease of Bath.  It is a Grade II* listed building. It stands within the grounds of the 16th century St Catherine's Court, which is Grade I listed.

References

External links

Civil parishes in Somerset
Villages in Bath and North East Somerset